MASTV was a Mexican wireless television company. The company belonged to MVS Comunicaciones. The company offered service to 11 cities in Mexico; Mexico City, Guadalajara, Leon, Mérida, Monterrey, Pachuca, Queretaro, San Luis Potosi, Toluca, Tuxtla Gutierrez, and Villahermosa. The company closed operations in July 2014,  and subscribers were migrated to parent operator Dish Mexico.

History 

The system started operations on September 1, 1989, as MVS Multivisión in Mexico City. It later expanded to 10 other markets across Mexico. In 2002, MVS Multivision changed its name to MASTV. MVS and Echostar Corporation operate the DTH  system Dish Mexico.

Channels 
Before the gradual shutdown of the company in 2014, the system offered 17 channels, including 5 of MVS own channels (52MX, Exa TV, Multicinema, Multipremier and Cinelatino) which are bolded on the list. All channels were transmitted either subtitled or in Spanish. MASTV distributes all these channels on the same number in all the cities it serves.

References

External links 
 MASTV Web site (redirects to a video showing the end of the service) 
 Official website MVS Comunicaciones 

MVS Comunicaciones
Cable television companies of Mexico
Defunct companies of Mexico